Ilja Seifert (6 May 1951 – 10 September 2022) was a German politician. A member of the Party of Democratic Socialism and later The Left, he served in the Volkskammer from March to October 1990 and in the Bundestag from 1990 to 1994, 1998 to 2002, and again from 2005 to 2013.

Seifert died on 10 September 2022, at the age of 71.

References

1951 births
2022 deaths
Socialist Unity Party of Germany members
Party of Democratic Socialism (Germany) politicians
21st-century German politicians
East German politicians
Members of the 10th Volkskammer
Members of the Bundestag for the Party of Democratic Socialism (Germany)
Members of the Bundestag for Berlin
Members of the Bundestag for The Left
Members of the Bundestag 1990–1994
Members of the Bundestag 1998–2002
Members of the Bundestag 2005–2009
Members of the Bundestag 2009–2013
Humboldt University of Berlin alumni
Politicians from Berlin